Ealing tube station could refer to one of a number of London Underground stations serving the Ealing area of west London:

 North Ealing
 Ealing Common
 South Ealing
 Ealing Broadway

Disambig-Class London Transport articles